St Cuthbert's Church, Kentmere is a Grade II listed parish church in the Church of England in Kentmere, Cumbria. Its benefice is united with that of St Martin's Church, Bowness-on-Windermere; St Anne's Church, Ings; St James' Church, Staveley; Jesus Church, Troutbeck and St Mary's Church, Windermere.

History
The church dates from the 16th century. It was surveyed by the architect, J. S. Crowther, of Manchester in 1864, who wrote a report to Vice-Admiral John Wilson of Troutbeck, concerning plans for the restoration. Crowther found that a wall had been built across the nave, reducing its length by one half. He suggested that this was removed. In addition he recommended re-slating the roof, adding cast iron gutters and downspouts, repairs to the woodwork of the doors and glazing of windows, installation of heating, re-fitting the chancel, a new wooden floor to support the seating, and the restoration of the tower.

It was rebuilt at a cost of £450, the tower was raised and the panelled square box pews were replaced by low backed open benches. It was re-opened for worship by the Bishop of Carlisle, Rt Revd Samuel Waldegrave on 22 November 1866.

Further alterations were made in the 1930s.

Organ
The church organ was built by Wilkinson and Son of Kendal. A specification of the organ can be found on the National Pipe Organ Register.

Memorials

 There is a plaque commemorating Bernard Gilpin (who was born in Kentmere) by the Keswick School of Industrial Art 1901

References

Church of England church buildings in Cumbria
Grade II listed churches in Cumbria